Crambus whalleyi is a moth in the family Crambidae. It was described by Stanisław Błeszyński in 1960. It is found in São Paulo, Brazil.

References

Crambini
Moths described in 1960
Moths of South America